Vikas Kohli is an Indian musician and music producer, whose work covers a variety of genres from punk, jazz, and hip-hop, to country, metal, and Bollywood pop. He is known for his expertise in song arrangements and his one-on-one artist development. As a producer, he is best known for founding Fatlabs.

Fatlabs (Music Studio)

Fatlabs is a home recording studio in Mississauga, Ontario, Canada, founded in 2003. Kohli is best known for his ability to work with multiple genres. He has produced punk, jazz, hip-hop, soul, country, pop, R&B, classical, metal, rock and bhangra albums.  He has also contributed songs to Bollywood films.

The song he produced for Bollywood film Mission Istaanbul was performed live at the International Indian Film Academy Awards. He composed a song for the Canadian Film Centre's Shanti Baba Ram & The Dancers of Hope, which aired on Canwest Global. He also composed the song "I Do. Do I?" He's produced two albums with The Responsibles, which were nominated for Punk Recording of the Year and charted nationally; co-wrote Jennifer Abadesso's song "Did You Think", which hit #1 in Paris; produced multi-million album selling Bhangra artist Mika Singh and collaborated on projects with Cappadonna (Wu-Tang Clan), Justin Nozuka, Moka Only and Apache Indian. Kohli has been profiled by CBC, The Globe and Mail, Toronto Star, Rogers TV, OMNI TV, Hindustan Times, MSN, AOL, Yahoo and Zee News.

Filmography

Education

Vikas Kohli went to the Mississauga branch campus of the University of Toronto, Ontario, Canada and received an honors degree in Mathematics and Philosophy. He received his MBA from the Schulich School of Business of York University, and also holds a CFA charter.

Events

International Indian Film Academy

Vikas Kohli has produced an event with the International Film Academy awards in Toronto which drew over 15,000 people.

Bollywood Monster Mashup

Vikas Kohli has produced an event from the city of Mississauga entitled "Bollywood Monster Mashup" which features over 50 singers, dancers and musicians singing, playing popular songs that expand over the black & white era of Indian Cinema to the modern hits of Bollywood.

Professional associations
Vikas Kohli is a member of the advisory board of the Blackwood Art Gallery, actively involved in the arts scene and has spoken at UNESCO, NXNE, SAC, CMW, MasalaMehndiMasti, Nashville Songwriters Association, Hamilton Music Awards, Toronto Independent Music Awards, FILMI, Toronto FIlmmakers Club, Mississauga Independent Film Festival, Undercurrents, JyaFest Arts Collective, Canada Career Arts, Tin Pan North, Trebas Institute, Durham College, Toronto City Summit Alliance and the City of Mississauga's Culture Division. He is a jury member for FACTOR, a member of the Screen Composers Guild of Canada and sits on the Arts and Culture Grant Assessment Committee for the City of Mississauga. In 2011, Kohli produced an original live concert for the IIFAs at Mississauga's Celebration Square, which featured over 50 musicians and dancers, including Bollywood singer Monali Thakur, a string ensemble, several Indian classical musicians, a rock band and was attended by over 15,000 people. As the architect behind FatLabs, Kohli personally brings his industry knowledge and creativity to each client.

References

Living people
Year of birth missing (living people)
Place of birth missing (living people)
Canadian record producers
CFA charterholders
Schulich School of Business alumni
University of Toronto alumni